Pailla Shekar Reddy  (born 1968) is an Indian politician affiliated with the Telangana Rashtra Samithi. He won from Bhongir constituency in Yadadri Bhuvanagiri district  in 2014 general elections. He belongs to Telangana Rashtra Samithi and is a member of its Politburo.

Early life 
Shekar Reddy was born in Kadireniguda, Nancharpet village, Athmakur Mandal of Yadadri Bhuvanagiri district to Pailla Ram Reddy, a small farmer. He completed his Diploma in Civil engineering, SES SN Murthy Polytechnic College, Khammam, Osmania University.

Career
He was a real estate developer in Hyderabad and Bangalore before entering politics.

Politics
He won in 2014 General Elections as MLA from Bhongir Assembly Constituency in Telangana state. He received 54,686 votes and defeated his nearest rival Jitta Balakrishna Reddy of YTP by 15,416 votes. The Bhongir constituency has vested with TDP since 1985 when Alimineti Madhava Reddy and later his wife have been representing the constituency.

Philanthropy
He has provided clean drinking water systems across Nalgonda district, which is notorious for his fluoride contamination.
One of the greatest things done by Shekhar Reddy is Bunadigani canal, which was pending since 2004. He is a people friendly leader.

Personal life
He is married and had one daughter and one son.

References 

1968 births
Living people
Telangana MLAs 2014–2018
Telangana Rashtra Samithi politicians
Telangana MLAs 2018–2023